Eduard ("Eddy") Herbert Tiel (December 29, 1926 in The Hague – February 21, 1993 in Emst) was a Dutch field hockey player who competed in the 1948 Summer Olympics and in the 1952 Summer Olympics.

In 1948 he was a member of the Dutch field hockey team, which won the bronze medal. He played all seven matches as halfback.

Four years later he won the silver medal as part of the Dutch team. He played all three matches as halfback.

External links
 
  Dutch Olympic Committee
profile

1926 births
1993 deaths
Dutch male field hockey players
Olympic field hockey players of the Netherlands
Field hockey players at the 1948 Summer Olympics
Field hockey players at the 1952 Summer Olympics
Olympic silver medalists for the Netherlands
Olympic bronze medalists for the Netherlands
Field hockey players from The Hague
Olympic medalists in field hockey
Medalists at the 1952 Summer Olympics
Medalists at the 1948 Summer Olympics